The Borgias is a historical drama created by Neil Jordan based upon the life of Rodrigo Borgia, later Pope Alexander VI, and his family. The series takes place in Rome, as well as several other locations in Italy and France, at the end of the 15th century and depicts Borgia's ruthless efforts to win the papal election, his eventual rise to the position of pope and his family's struggle to maintain and increase their political power. The series premiered on Showtime on April 3, 2011, with the Canadian premiere happening one hour later on Bravo!. The two-hour premiere was the most-watched original Canadian series premiere on Bravo! and the fourth-most-watched-overall program in the channel's history with 575,000 viewers. On June 5, 2013, after three seasons, Showtime officially cancelled The Borgias. The last episode aired on June 16, 2013.

In total, 29 episodes of The Borgias were broadcast over three seasons.

Series overview

Episodes

Season 1 (2011)

Season 2 (2012)

Season 3 (2013)

References

External links 
  at Showtime
  at Bravo!
 

Lists of Canadian drama television series episodes
Lists of Hungarian drama television series episodes
Lists of Irish drama television series episodes
2011 Canadian television seasons
2012 Canadian television seasons
2013 Canadian television seasons
2011 Hungarian television seasons
2012 Hungarian television seasons
2013 Hungarian television seasons
2011 Irish television seasons
2012 Irish television seasons
2013 Irish television seasons